The Moldovan Cyrillic alphabet is a Cyrillic alphabet designed for the Romanian language spoken in the Soviet Union (Moldovan) and was in official use from 1924 to 1932 and 1938 to 1989 (and still in use today in the breakaway Moldovan region of Transnistria).

History
Until the 19th century, Romanian was usually written using a local variant of the Cyrillic alphabet. A variant based on the reformed Russian civil script, first introduced in the late 18th century, became widespread in Bessarabia after its annexation to the Russian Empire, while the rest of the Principality of Moldavia gradually switched to a Latin-based alphabet, adopted officially after its union with Wallachia that resulted in the creation of Romania. Grammars and  dictionaries published in Bessarabia before 1917, both those that used the label "Moldovan" and the few that used "Romanian", used a version of the Cyrillic alphabet, with its use continuing in Bessarabia even after the 1918 union, in order to make the publications more accessible to peasant readers. The Moldovan Cyrillic alphabet was officially introduced in the early 1920s, in the Soviet bid to standardise the orthography of Romanian in the Moldavian ASSR; at the same time furthering political objectives by marking a clear distinction from the Latin-based Romanian orthography introduced in Romania in the 1860s. As was the case with other Cyrillic-based languages in the Soviet Union, such as Russian, Ukrainian or Belarusian, obsolete and redundant characters were dropped in an effort to simplify orthography and boost literacy. It was abandoned for a Latin-based alphabet during the Union-wide Latinisation campaign in 1932. Its re-introduction was decided by the Central Executive Committee of the Moldavian Autonomous Soviet Socialist Republic on May 19, 1938, albeit with an orthography more similar to standard Russian. Following the Soviet occupation of Bessarabia and Northern Bukovina, it was established as the official alphabet of the Moldavian Soviet Socialist Republic until 1989, when a law returned to the standard, Latin-based, Romanian alphabet.

There were several requests to switch back to the Latin alphabet, which was seen "more suitable for the Romance core of the language", in the Moldavian SSR. In 1965, the demands of the 3rd Congress of Writers of Soviet Moldavia were rejected by the leadership of the Communist Party, the replacement being deemed "contrary to the interests of the Moldavian people and not reflecting its aspirations and hopes".

The Moldovan Cyrillic alphabet is still the official and the only accepted alphabet in Transnistria for this language.

Moldovan Cyrillic spellings are also used in the media and in governmental publications in the Republic of Moldova for the names of settlements when writing in Russian, as opposed to using their Russian forms (e.g. Кишинэу is used in place of Кишинёв for the name of the city of Chișinău).

Description
All but one of the letters of this alphabet can be found in the modern Russian alphabet, the exception being the zhe with breve: Ӂ ӂ (U+04C1, U+04C2). The Russian letters Ё, Щ, and Ъ are absent from the Moldovan Cyrillic alphabet.

The following chart shows the Moldovan Cyrillic alphabet compared with the Latin alphabet currently in use. IPA values are given for the post-1957 literary standard.

Sample text

This text is from Limba noastră.

See also

 Romanian alphabet
 Romanian Cyrillic alphabet
 Romanian transitional alphabet
 Ӂ

References

Notes

External links
 Moldovan Cyrillic alphabet – example text and comparison with Latin script
 Moldovan Cyrillic (молдовеняскэ) • Keyboard Layout for Windows

Cyrillic alphabets
Alphabet
Cyrillic alphabets
Politics of Transnistria
Romania–Soviet Union relations
Transnistrian culture